Campmuir is a small village in the Perth and Kinross area of Scotland.

The village is the site of a Roman field camp, discovered in 1754.

References

Villages in Perth and Kinross